Trigonorhinus is a genus of fungus weevils in the beetle family Anthribidae. There are about 16 described species in Trigonorhinus.

Species
These 16 species belong to the genus Trigonorhinus:

 Trigonorhinus alternatus (Say, 1827)
 Trigonorhinus annulatus (Carr, 1930)
 Trigonorhinus areolatus (Boheman, 1845)
 Trigonorhinus championi (Jordan, 1906)
 Trigonorhinus griseus (LeConte, 1876)
 Trigonorhinus lepidus Valentine, 1998
 Trigonorhinus limbatus (Say, 1827)
 Trigonorhinus nigromaculatus (Schaeffer, 1906)
 Trigonorhinus ornatus (Schaeffer, 1906)
 Trigonorhinus riddelliae
 Trigonorhinus rotundatus (LeConte, 1876)
 Trigonorhinus sordidus (Scudder, 1893)
 Trigonorhinus sticticus (Boheman, 1833)
 Trigonorhinus strigosus (Jordan, 1907)
 Trigonorhinus tomentosus (Say, 1827)
 Trigonorhinus zeae (Wolfrum, 1931)

References

Further reading

 
 

Anthribidae
Articles created by Qbugbot